Ridge Peak is a pyramidal rocky peak, 510 m, from which a prominent ridge extends eastward, standing 2.5 nautical miles (4.6 km) southwest of Trepassey Bay between Cairn Hill and Lizard Hill on Tabarin Peninsula. This area was first explored by a party of the Swedish Antarctic Expedition, 1901–04. Ridge Peak was charted and named by the Falkland Islands Dependencies Survey (FIDS), 1946.
 

Mountains of Trinity Peninsula